Involution may refer to:

 Involute, a construction in the differential geometry of curves
 Agricultural Involution: The Processes of Ecological Change in Indonesia, a 1963 study of intensification of production through increased labour inputs
 Involution (mathematics), a function that is its own inverse
 Involution (medicine), the shrinking of an organ (such as the uterus after pregnancy)
 Involution (esoterism), several notions of a counterpart to evolution
 Involution (Meher Baba), the inner path of the human soul to the self
 Involution algebra, a *-algebra: an algebra equipped with an involution
 Involution (album), a 1998 album by multi-instrumentalist Michael Marcus, with the Jaki Byard trio
 Involution (film), a 2018 Russian sci-fi drama film